Victor Lenaers (12 January 1893 – 12  November 1968) was a Belgian racing cyclist. He competed in the Tour de France from 1921 to 1924.

Major results

1921
1921 Tour de France:
6th place overall classification
1922
1922 Tour de France:
5th place overall classification

References

External links 

Official Tour de France results for Victor Lenaers

1893 births
1968 deaths
People from Tongeren
Belgian male cyclists
Cyclists from Limburg (Belgium)